The Lesser Evil is a 1998 thriller film directed by David Mackay.

Plot
Four old friends, Derek (Colm Feore), George (David Paymer), Ivan (Arliss Howard), and Frank (Tony Goldwyn), are reunited when they become suspects in a double murder that took place twenty years before, when they were teenagers. The four covered it up and have now become successful professionals with seemingly normal lives.

The story switches back and forth between the present day and the time of the killings. As the police investigation closes in on the four men, they turn on each other. It soon becomes clear that one of them will have to take the blame, or they will all be convicted.

Cast
Colm Feore as Derek Eastman
David Paymer as George
Arliss Howard as Ivan Williams
Tony Goldwyn as Frank O'Brian
Steven Petrarca as Young Frank
Adam Scott as Young George
Jonathon Scarfe as Young Derek
Marc Worden as Young Ivan
Jack Kehler as Detective Hardaway
Mason Adams as Derek's father

Reception

The film has a 60% approval rating on the review aggregator Rotten Tomatoes based on 5 reviews, with an average score of 7.07/10. Variety gave a positive review, calling the film "a crafty and well-crafted drama", and Film Threat praised it as "an exceptionally well told tale".

References

External links 
MGM page

1998 films
1990s thriller drama films
American thriller films
Film noir
Films scored by Don Davis (composer)
1998 drama films
1990s English-language films
1990s American films